The 5th Golden Rooster Award honoring the best in film of 1985, was given in Chengdu, Sichuan Province, May 23, 1985.

Winners & Nominees 

{| class=wikitable style="width="150%"
|-
! style="background: gold;" ! style="width="50%" | Best Film
! style="background: gold;" ! style="width="50%" | Best Director
|-
| valign="top" |

The Girl in Red
Wreaths at the Foot of the Mountain
Girl from Mt. Huangshan
Tan Sitong

| valign="top" |

Ling Zifeng－The Border Town
Xie Jin－Wreaths at the Foot of the Mountain
Zhang Yuan/Yu Yanfu－Girl from Mt. Huangshan
Lu Xiaoya－The Girl in Red

|-
! style="background: gold;" ! style="width="50%" | Best Children Film
! style="background: gold;" ! style="width="50%" | Best Writing
|-
| valign="top" |

我和我的同学们

| valign="top" |

Li Zhun/Li Cunbao－Wreaths at the Foot of the Mountain
Peng Mingyan/Bi Jianchang－Girl from Mt. Huangshan

|-
! style="background: gold;" ! style="width="50%" | Best Actor
! style="background: gold;" ! style="width="50%" | Best Actress
|-
| valign="top" |

Lu Xiaohe－Wreaths at the Foot of the Mountain
Feng Hanyuan－Border Town

| valign="top" |

Li Ling－Girl from Mt. Huangshan
Gu Yongfei－Thunder 

|-
! style="background: gold;" ! style="width="50%" | Best Supporting Actor
! style="background: gold;" ! style="width="50%" | Best Supporting Actress
|-
| valign="top" |

He Wei－Wreaths at the Foot of the Mountain
Li Moran－Garden Street Number 5

| valign="top" |

Wang Yumei－Tan Sitong
Ding Yi－Girl from Mt. Huangshan
Gai Ke－Wreaths at the Foot of the Mountain'’

|-
! style="background: gold;" ! style="width="50%" | Best Chinese Opera Film
! style="background: gold;" ! style="width="50%" | Best Documentary
|-
| valign="top" |五女拜寿| valign="top" |零的突破老北京的叙说|-
! style="background: gold;" ! style="width="50%" | Best Animation
! style="background: gold;" ! style="width="50%" | Best Popular Science Film
|-
| valign="top" |火童| valign="top" |广开节能之路细胞重建|-
! style="background: gold;" ! style="width="50%" | Best Cinematography
! style="background: gold;" ! style="width="50%" | Best Art Direction
|-
| valign="top" |'Yellow Earth－Zhang YimouYamaha Fish Stall－Han Xingyuan/Wang Hengli
Thunderstorm－Luo Congzhou
Border Town－Liang Ziyong

| valign="top" |Yamaha Fish Stall－Zhang ZhichuBorder Town－Xia Rujin
Thunderstorm－Han Shangyi/Qu Ranxin
Tan Sitong－Jin Xiwu

|-
! style="background: gold;" ! style="width="50%" | Best Music
! style="background: gold;" ! style="width="50%" | Best Sound Recording
|-
| valign="top" |Ren Sheng－Xu YoufuThe Girl in Red－Wang Ming
Thunderstorm－Lu Qiming
Border Town－Liu Zhuang

| valign="top" |Thunderstorm－Miao Zhenyu/Feng DeyaoGirl from Mt. Huangshan－Chen Wenyuan/Fu Linge

|-
! style="background: gold;" ! style="width="50%" | Best Editing
! style="background: gold;" ! style="width="50%"|Best Property 
|-
| valign="top" |Wreaths at the Foot of the Mountain－Zhou DingwenThe Girl in Red－Yuan Yongfang
Yamaha Fish Stall－Li Yingshuang
Girl from Mt. Huangshan－Li Zhonglin

| valign="top" |

N/A
Thunderstorm－Qian Zhangxiong/Lin Youxing
Tan Sitong－Chen Xiancheng/Yang Zhoumin

|-
! style="background: gold;" ! style="width="50%" | Best Custome
! style="background: gold;" ! style="width="50%"|Best Make Up 
|-
| valign="top" |

N/A

| valign="top" |

N/A

|-
! style="background: gold;" ! style="width="50%" | Best Stunt
! style="background: gold;" ! style="width="50%"|
|-
| valign="top" |

N/A

| valign="top" |

|}

 Special Award Special Jury Award'Documentary: 100 Days of Hong KongComedy: 阿混新传''

References

External links 
 The 5th Golden Rooster Award for

1985
1985 film awards
1985 in China
1980s in Chinese cinema